Ping Tun is a village in Sai Kung District, Hong Kong.

Administration
Ping Tun is a recognized village under the New Territories Small House Policy.

History
In 1955, Ping Tun was reported as having a population of 31, with the surname Cheung. It was described by Austin Coates as "a high village cultivating rice at a surprisingly high level".

References

External links
 Delineation of area of existing village Ping Tun (Sai Kung) for election of resident representative (2019 to 2022)

Villages in Sai Kung District, Hong Kong